Chris Miller is a New Zealand former cricketer who played as a wicket-keeper and right-handed batter. She appeared in 10 One Day Internationals for International XI at the 1982 World Cup. She played domestic cricket for North Shore.

References

External links
 
 

Living people
Date of birth missing (living people)
Year of birth missing (living people)
Place of birth missing (living people)
New Zealand women cricketers
International XI women One Day International cricketers
North Shore women cricketers